Jare Henrik Tiihonen 2 is the sixth studio album by Finnish rapper Cheek. It was released on 22 September 2010. The album peaked at number one on the Official Finnish Album Chart.

Track listing

Charts

Release history

References

Cheek (rapper) albums
2010 albums